The first season of Teenage Mutant Ninja Turtles originally aired between February 8, 2003 and November 1, 2003, beginning with the pilot episode "Things Change". The episodes were first released in eight volumes, TMNT Volume one through Volume eight. The volumes were released From September 2, 2003 through March 16, 2004. The episodes were later released in 2 part season sets, part 1 was released on May 22, 2007 which had the first 12 episodes, and part 2 was released on September 18, 2007, this had the final 14 episodes of the season.

Story
The season primarily focuses on the Turtles slowly coming into conflict with the Foot Clan. After their lair is destroyed by Baxter Stockman's mousers, they find a new home elsewhere in the sewers and also gain new allies in the form of April O'Neil and Casey Jones. The Turtles foil the plans of the Shredder, Hun, and Stockman on numerous occasions before Shredder offers Leonardo a peace offering in exchange for their service, citing an unknown evil they must face together. Splinter reveals the Shredder and Hun's hand in murdering his master Hamato Yoshi, and the two sides come to blows in a battle that seemingly ends in the Shredder's defeat. However, unknown to the Turtles, the Shredder survives, and after his ninjas savagely ambush and wound Leonardo, destroys April's home and believes them dead, though the Turtles, Splinter, Casey and April survive and depart for Casey's family's farm house in rural New York. After Leonardo's wounds heal and their resolve is restored, the group returns to New York to face the Foot Clan. However, after their triumph against the Shredder, Splinter vanishes, and after following a lead from a mysterious group known as the "Guardians", the Turtles discover the Utroms, an alien race hiding amongst humanity, and are unable to save Splinter from them before being teleported into space.

Cast 
 Michael Sinterniklaas as Leonardo: the eldest and the leader of the Turtles who wields twin katana swords and a blue mask. (Appears in all 26 episodes.)
 Frank Frankson as Raphael: Leonardo's stubborn and temperamental second-in-command. Wields twin sai and a red mask. (Appears in all 26 episodes.)
 Wayne Grayson as Michelangelo: the Turtles' youngest and funniest member and a large source of comic relief who wields twin nunchucks and an orange mask. (Appears in all 26 episodes.)
 Sam Riegel as Donatello: the Turtles' genius engineer who is the primary source of their devices and vehicles. Wields a bo staff and a purple mask. (Appears in all 26 episodes.)
 Darren Dunstan as Splinter: the Turtles' sensei and adopted father, the former pet of Hamato Yoshi. (Appears in 22 episodes.)

Supporting
 Veronica Taylor as April O'Neil: the first human the Turtles and Splinter meet who is quickly integrated into their family. (Appears in 16 episodes.)
 Marc Thompson as Casey Jones: an ally of the Turtles who has a violent enmity with Hun. (Appears in 12 episodes.)

Villains
 Scottie Ray as Oroku Saki / The Shredder: the main antagonist of the series and leader of the Foot Clan, who murdered Hamato Yoshi. (Appears in 13 episodes.)
 Greg Carey as Hun: the Shredder's second-in-command, a hulking gangster who leads the Purple Dragons on behalf of his master.
 Scott Williams as Baxter Stockman: a brilliant, maniacal scientist working for the Foot who is mutilated every time he fails the Shredder.

Crew
Teenage Mutant Ninja Turtles was produced by Mirage Studios, 4 Kids Entertainment, 4Kids Productions, and Dong Woo Animation and distributed by 4 Kids Entertainment and was aired on Fox's Saturday morning kids' block in the US. The producers were Gary Richardson, Frederick U. Fierst, and Joellyn Marlow for the American team; Tae Ho Han was the producer for the Korean team. The entire season was directed by Chuck Patton. The writers for season one were Michael Ryan, Marty Isenberg, Eric Luke, and Greg Johnson.

Reception
The first season of the show received generally positive acclaim. As of December 2003 it had 2.89 million views on the 4kids website. It holds a current rank of 89%.

Episodes

References

External links

Season One Episode list with detailed synopses at the Official Ninja Turtles website

2003 American television seasons
Season 1
Television shows set in Massachusetts